The Victoria Island structure is a  bowl-shaped structure buried in the shale sediments of the Sacramento-San Joaquin River Delta,  west of Stockton, California. The circular structure is part of a former sea bed, and lies 1,490–1,600 meters (4,890–4,250 ft) below sea level.

Discovered during oil exploration and reported at the Lunar and Planetary Science Conference in Houston, Texas, in March 2007, it is thought to be a buried impact crater formed between 37 and 49 million years ago.

The current publications do not list a more precise location for the impact structure than the island.

See also
 List of possible impact structures on Earth

References

External links 
 BBC News
 Aerial Exploration of the Victoria Island Structure

Impact craters of the United States
Eocene impact craters
Possible impact craters on Earth
Landforms of San Joaquin County, California
Landforms of California